Elio Bianchi (born 3 March 1920) is an Italian retired professional football player. He was born in Rome.

He played one game in the Serie A in the 1938/39 season for A.S. Roma.

See also
List of football clubs in Italy

References

1920 births
Possibly living people
Italian footballers
Serie A players
A.S. Roma players
Rimini F.C. 1912 players
Association football forwards